Liu Ping is the name of:

Liu Ping (activist) (born 1964), Chinese civil rights activist
Liu Ping (sprinter) (born 1984), Chinese Paralympic sprinter
Liu Ping (water polo) (born 1987), Chinese water polo player

See also
Liu Bing (disambiguation) (Liu Bing is the pinyin equivalent of Liu Ping in older sources)